The 2015–16 UC Riverside Highlanders men's basketball team represented the University of California, Riverside during the 2015–16 NCAA Division I men's basketball season. The Highlanders were led by third year head coach Dennis Cutts and played their home games at the Student Recreation Center Arena as members of the Big West Conference. They finished the season 14–19, 5–11 in Big West play to finish in a tie for sixth place. They lost in the first round of the Big West tournament to Long Beach State.

Roster

Schedule and results
Source: 

|-
!colspan=9 style=| Exhibition

|-
!colspan=9 style=| Non-conference games

|-
!colspan=9 style=| Big West Tournament

References

UC Riverside Highlanders men's basketball seasons
UC Riverside